9,10-Bis(phenylethynyl)anthracene (BPEA) is an aromatic hydrocarbon with the chemical formula is C30H18. It displays strong fluorescence and is used as a chemiluminescent fluorophore with high quantum efficiency.

It is used in lightsticks as a fluorophor producing ghostly green light. It is also used as a dopant for organic semiconductors in OLEDs.

The emission wavelength can be lowered by substituting the anthracene core by halogens or alkyls. 2-ethyl and 1,2-dimethyl substituted BPEAs are also in use.
 1-chloro-9,10-bis(phenylethynyl)anthracene emits yellow-green light, used in 30-minute high-intensity Cyalume sticks
 2-chloro-9,10-bis(phenylethynyl)anthracene emits green light, used in 12-hour low-intensity Cyalume sticks

See also 
 Lightstick
 Organic light-emitting diode
 5,12-Bis(phenylethynyl)naphthacene
 9,10-Diphenylanthracene

External links 
 Absorption and emission spectra
 National Pollutant Inventory - Polycyclic Aromatic Hydrocarbon Fact Sheet
 Novel red-emitting BPEAs

Fluorescent dyes
Organic semiconductors
Anthracenes
Diynes
Phenyl compounds
Alkyne derivatives